Justice Johnson may refer to:

United States Supreme Court
Thomas Johnson (judge) (1732–1819), associate justice of the United States Supreme Court
William Johnson (judge) (1771–1834), associate justice of the United States Supreme Court

United States state supreme courts
Alexander S. Johnson, chief judge of the New York Court of Appeals
Benjamin Johnson (Rhode Island), associate justice of the Rhode Island Supreme Court
Benjamin A. Johnson, associate justice of the Maryland Court of Appeals
Bernette Joshua Johnson, chief justice of the Louisiana Supreme Court
Byron J. Johnson, associate justice of the Idaho Supreme Court
Cecil E. Johnson, associate justice of the Arkansas Supreme Court
Clarke Howard Johnson, associate justice of the Rhode Island Supreme Court
Charles W. Johnson (jurist), associate chief justice of the Washington Supreme Court
David Johnson (Michigan jurist), associate justice of the Michigan Supreme Court
Denise R. Johnson, associate justice of the Vermont Supreme Court
Harvey M. Johnsen, associate justice of the Nebraska Supreme Court
Howard A. Johnson, associate justice of the Montana Supreme Court
J. Mercer Johnson, associate justice of the Arizona Supreme Court
J. Neely Johnson, justice of the Nevada Supreme Court from 1867 to 1871
J. Philip Johnson, justice of the North Dakota Supreme Court from 1974 to 1975 and again in 1992
James D. Johnson, associate justice of the Arkansas Supreme Court
James G. Johnson, associate justice of the Supreme Court of Ohio
James M. Johnson (judge), associate justice of the Washington Supreme Court
Jefferson D. Johnson Jr., associate justice of the North Carolina Supreme Court
John Johnson Sr., judge of the Maryland Court of Appeals
John Johnson (Indiana judge), associate justice of the Indiana Supreme Court Justices
John T. Johnson (Oklahoma judge), associate justice of the Oklahoma Supreme Court
Lee A. Johnson, associate justice of the Kansas Supreme Court
Nels Johnson (judge), associate justice of the North Dakota Supreme Court
Okey Johnson, associate justice of the Supreme Court of Appeals of West Virginia
Phil Johnson (judge), associate justice of the Supreme Court of Texas
Sveinbjorn Johnson, associate justice of the North Dakota Supreme Court
Thomas Johnson (Arkansas), associate justice of the Arkansas Supreme Court
William Samuel Johnson, member of the colonial Connecticut Supreme Court 1772–1774
William Wartenbee Johnson, associate justice of the Supreme Court of Ohio

See also
Judge Johnson (disambiguation)